Painless is a 2012 fantasy horror film and the feature film directorial debut of Juan Carlos Medina. The film is a joint production between Spain, France, and Portugal and had its world premiere on 8 September 2012 at the Toronto International Film Festival. Painless is set in Catalonia and follows two different story lines, one set during the Spanish Civil War and one set in the modern day.

Synopsis
The film's premise is partially set in 1931 during the Spanish Civil War, where a group of children are brought to a monastery turned hospital for medical testing. None of the children are capable of feeling physical pain, something that Dr. Holzmann (Derek de Lint) hopes to remedy with his procedures. However at the same time his colleague Dr. Carcedo (Ramon Fontserè) believes that the children would be better off locked up in his asylum in Canfranc. One young patient named Benigno (played at different ages by Ilias and Mot Stothart) stands out in particular, as he proves to be exceptionally intelligent but also easily prone to violent outbursts - something that Carcedo believes is further proof of his beliefs. Holzmann's plans are ultimately never brought to fruition, as the hospital is besieged and taken over by several different military forces.

The movie is also set during modern day, where David (Àlex Brendemühl) has woken up in a hospital to discover that he had been in a serious automobile accident. His pregnant wife (who had been riding in the car with him) did not survive the crash but the doctors did manage to save the baby, who is now being housed in another floor of the hospital. To add to his misery, the doctors inform David that scans of his body has revealed that he has lymphoma and requires a bone marrow transplant if he is to have any chance of survival. David turns to his parents in hopes that one of them can donate their marrow, only to learn that he was adopted. From there, David sets out to find his biological parents, a process that inevitably leads him to the hospital that was run by Holzmann and Carcedo. He eventually discovers that his father is Benigno, who was renamed Berkano (Tómas Lemarquis) by one of the military forces, and that Berkano had become a prolific torturer for this new regime, still kept in his original cell no. 17 of the monastery, that had been turned into prison.

Cast
Àlex Brendemühl as David
Tómas Lemarquis as Berkano
Ilias Stothart as Child Benigno
Mot Stothart as Adolescent Benigno
Derek de Lint as Dr. Holzmann
Ramon Fontserè as Dr. Carcedo
Sílvia Bel as Judith
Bea Segura as Magdalena
Juan Diego as Adán Martel mayor
Félix Gómez as Adán Martel joven
Irene Montalà as Anaïs
Àngels Poch as Clara Martel
Ariadna Cabrol as María
Bruna Montoto as Inés niña
Liah O'Prey as Inés adolescente

Reception
Critical reception for Painless has been mostly positive. Reviewers for The Hollywood Reporter praised the film, with one reviewer drawing favorable comparisons to Guillermo del Toro's The Devil's Backbone and Pan’s Labyrinth. Twitch Film also praised the film, writing "Absolutely beautifully shot and performed, Painless is filled with interesting ideas and images that establish Medina - with his first feature here - as a director of uncommon visual skills." Dread Central and Ain't It Cool News were more mixed in their reviews, and Ain't It Cool News wrote that "PAINLESS has some superb sections with child actors at their best and has an evocative examination of what humanizes the heart. Unfortunately, it does not focus enough on this and becomes too interested in dealing a didactic ‘sins of the fathers’ tract that jars with its more timeless magic."

References

External links
 
 

2012 films
2012 horror films
2012 fantasy films
Spanish horror films
2010s Spanish-language films
Spanish Civil War films
Portuguese fantasy films
Portuguese horror films
Films about children
2010s Spanish films
2010s French films